The 190 mile long (300 km) Swift Current-Battleford Trail was an important late-19th century transportation and communications link between settlements of Swift Current and Battleford - the result of a brisk trade, in buffalo bones which resulted heavy traffic between the two regions. Because of the large volume of Red River cart traffic, the ruts created during this period are still visible today. The historical significance of this resulted in The Battleford Trail becoming a provincial heritage site in 1982.

History 
 First Nations Era - In pre-contact times, First Nations likely used the trail's general route as a way of travelling between wintering areas to the north of Battleford and the rich summer bison hunting grounds around Swift Current.
 Métis Era - The Trail was used by the Métis in the earliest days when they roamed across the prairie hunting buffalo. When the railway finally arrived in Swift Current in early 1883, the entrepreneurial Métis began hauling freight and mail along the trail overland to Battleford. Prior to that, goods were hauled overland to Battleford from Winnipeg. Soon after, settlers, merchants, traders, and even government officials followed the Métis' lead and began using the trail. The route was in such demand that a stagecoach was established to transport people, freight, and mail between the two points.
 Railway Era - Fort Battleford was the seat of the North-West Territories Government when the Canadian Pacific Railway arrived in Swift Current in 1883. As Swift Current was the closest railway head to Battleford, it became Battleford's primary trade and communication link to the outside world and remained so until 1891. An official survey and mapping of the trail was undertaken by R.C. Laurie in 1886.
 North-West Rebellion Era - During the North-West Rebellion of 1885, Colonel William D. Otter, his troops, and around 50 North-West Mounted Police (NWMP) officers travelled the route on the march from Swift Current to Battleford to confront Louis Riel’s forces. The NWMP patrolled the trail from Swift Current to the Battlefords to ensure that military supplies arrived safely at their destination. They provided security for the 500 troops as well as the 200 civilian teamsters who were contracted to haul the supplies. Starting in 1886 the police presence in the area was reduced in numbers, however police continued patrols to provide general security, enforce laws, and assist settlers. For several years, the trail was well-trafficked with people, freight, and mail all using the route.
 Era of Decline - The trail was only active for about 7 years as a result of the construction of a railway between Regina and Prince Albert via Saskatoon in 1890. This made Saskatoon the closet railway to Battleford and signalled the end of the Swift Current - Battlefords Trail. The trail remained in use for local travel as late as 1925.

Important sites on the trail 

Sixty Mile Bush Outpost -  Sixty Mile Bush Outpost was an important rest stop on the Swift Current-Battleford Trail. It was located close to the current town of Biggar, Saskatchewan on Township 34 Range 15 West of the 3rd Meridian. It was named sixty mile bush as a result of being about sixty miles south of Battleford. It served as a NWMP post and a way station for travellers and the stagecoach. Half-way houses were established about every forty miles along the trail to supply the stage coaches with a fresh set of four horses. They were stocked with food and provisions for the winter months for stage coach stopovers and a rest stop for passengers. In 1910 a few Métis were ranching in the area at which time a Catholic mission was established. Settlers began arriving in the area around 1906 and began laying claims to homesteads. The Sixty Mile Bush Outpost Monument, erected to commemorate the post reads; "This was the site of the sixty mile bush outpost. A stopping place on the Swift Current-Battleford Trail. A log house provided lodging over the trail. Two NWMP were stationed here from 1886 to 1889. The house later became a store for the settlers. A Roman Catholic Church was built at the site in 1906. The settlement disbanded about 1911 after the Grand Trunk Pacific Railroad and the town of Biggar were established."

Battleford Trail Wheel Rut Area -  The Battleford Trail Wheel Rut Area is located in the city of Swift Current. It consists of a small plot of native grass prairie that contains two deep and parallel Red River cart and wagon wheel ruts. These marks in the ground are the remnants of the historic Swift Current-Battleford Trail and have been designated as a Municipal Heritage Property.

Communities near the trail 

Several modern communities exist on or near the original Swift Current-Battleford trail, some of them, like Swift Current and Battleford, existed at the time, while others have grown up along the trail since then.

Swift Current
Stewart Valley
Saskatchewan Landing
Kyle
Sanctuary
 Otter Spring
Elrose
Rosetown
Herschel
Biggar
Cando
Mosquito First Nation
Battleford

See also 
Transportation in Saskatchewan

References

External links 
 Tourism Swift Current
 Swift Current Museum
 Trail of the Mounties

Swift Current
Tourist attractions in Saskatchewan
Heritage sites in Saskatchewan
Historic trails and roads in Saskatchewan